The London and Middlesex Archaeological Society (LAMAS) is a society founded in 1855 for the study of the archaeology and local history of the City of London and the historic county of Middlesex. It also takes an interest in districts that were historically in Surrey, Kent, Essex and Hertfordshire, but that now lie within Greater London. The Society receives support from the Museum of London, and works in close association both with the Museum and with Museum of London Archaeology. It acts to some extent as an umbrella organisation to support smaller archaeological and local history societies in the Greater London area. It hosts an Annual Conference of London Archaeologists and an annual Local History Conference.

History
The Society was established in 1855 "for the purpose of investigating the antiquities and early history of the Cities of London and Westminster and the Metropolitan County of Middlesex". The inaugural meeting was held on 14 December 1855 at Crosby Hall, Bishopsgate. The primary instigators were George Bish Webb (who was already honorary secretary of Surrey Archaeological Society, established the previous year, and who became the first honorary secretary of LAMAS); and Rev. Thomas Hugo, curate of St Botolph-without-Bishopsgate (who became the first chairman of LAMAS). Other founder members included Charles Boutell, Henry Christmas, George Gilbert Scott, and Charles Roach Smith. Boutell served as honorary secretary from 23 July to 27 November 1857, but was dismissed for what was termed "improper" bookkeeping involving the disappearance of £56 15s received in subscription fees. Also active in the early decades were John Gough Nichols and Edward Brabrook (the latter eventually serving as President from 1910 to 1930). Sir Thomas Phillipps was another early supporter, but allegedly withdrew on learning that Hugo had expressed a wish to see the restoration of the monasteries.

Membership
Individual membership in the Society is open to all. In the early years, and until the late 1870s, membership seems to have stood at around 400. The total subsequently started to decline, falling to 277 in 1891, 163 in 1905, and 132 in 1911. It then began to recover, rising to 232 in 1939, 350 in 1950, and nearly 500 in 1955. The figure was 662 in 2004; 675 in 2010; and 608 in 2018.

Any archaeological or local history society in the Greater London area may become an Affiliated Society of LAMAS. As of 2020, there were 53 such affiliate members.

Publications
The Society's journal is entitled Transactions of the London and Middlesex Archaeological Society. It is published annually, and is issued free to members.

The historic numbering of the volumes of Transactions may cause confusion. The first volume was published in three parts between 1856 and 1860, and the final part of volume 6 appeared in 1890: these six volumes form what is now known as the "first series". The next volume was completed in 1905, and was numbered as volume 1 of the "new series". This new series continued to volume 11 (dated 1952). The decision was then taken to revert to the original scheme of numbering, and so the next volume, dated 1955, was numbered volume 18 (the numbers 12–17 having been omitted). Volume 70 is dated 2019.

All volumes of Transactions to volume 67 (2016) have been digitised, and are freely available to download from the Society's website.

Since 1976, the Society has also published occasional monographs or collections of essays in its "Special Papers" series. The 17th volume in this series was published in 2014. The first 16 volumes have been digitised, and are available to download from the Society's website. Three additional volumes of Special Papers, dealing with excavations in Southwark, Lambeth and Staines, have been published jointly with the Surrey Archaeological Society.

The Society publishes a Newsletter, which is produced three times a year and sent to all members. It is also available in digitised form on the Society's website.

Stow Memorial Service
The Society is joint sponsor and organiser (with the Merchant Taylors' Company) of the regular Stow Memorial Service, held in the church of St Andrew Undershaft in the City of London. This commemorates the antiquary John Stow, author of the Survey of London (1598; second edition 1603), who is widely revered as the founding father of London history. The service is normally held close to the anniversary of Stow's death on 5 April, and includes an address by a respected London historian or archaeologist, and the replacement of the (real) quill pen held by Stow's effigy on his monument in the church. The service was first held in its present form in 1924, and was then held annually until 1991, including the years of the Second World War. No services could be held in 1992 or 1993 because of damage to the church caused by the Baltic Exchange bomb of 1992. The service was revived in 1994, but from 1996 to 2017 was held only once every three years. The service due to take place in 2020 was cancelled because of the COVID-19 pandemic.

LAMAS Research Fund
The Society awards small grants (envisaged as totalling approximately £3,000–£5,000 per annum) to support research into the archaeology and history of London and Middlesex. The grants are available to all full individual members of the Society. The scheme was inaugurated in 2005 to mark the Society's 150th anniversary.

Logo

The Society's logo comprises a monochrome pseudo-heraldic coat of arms, combining elements of the authentic arms of the City of London, the City of Westminster and the county of Middlesex, as they normally appeared in the mid 19th century. The shield is quarterly, with the first and fourth quarters occupied by the arms of the City of London, the second by those of Westminster, and the third by those of Middlesex. The crest and supporters are taken from the arms of the City of London: a "Muscovy hat" surmounted by a dragon's wing charged with a cross, for the crest; and two dragons charged on the wings with crosses for supporters. Beneath the arms, a motto scroll reads "1855", the year of the Society's foundation. The present rendition is by Kenneth Ody, and was introduced in 1955, the Society's centenary year. In Ody's full design, the arms were placed within an oval border bearing the words "London and Middlesex Archaeological Society", but the border was often omitted, and was abandoned entirely in the early 1990s.

Ody's design was a reworking of the Society's original device, introduced at its foundation, and engraved by Orlando Jewitt (one of the original members). This showed the same combined arms, presented as if on a medieval seal, and surrounded by the legend +LONDON⋅AND⋅MIDDLESEX⋅ARCHÆOL⋅SOC⋅ESTAB⋅MDCCCLV. The only heraldic variation is that in Jewitt's design the supporters appear as wyverns (i.e. with only two legs), rather than four-legged dragons. By the mid-20th century, Jewitt's design was considered "perhaps a little crowded", and Ody was asked to redraw it to "represent the taste of 1955".

Presidents
The following have served as presidents of the Society:

 1855–1860: Albert Denison, 1st Baron Londesborough
 1860–1883: James Talbot, 4th Baron Talbot of Malahide
 1883–1885: General Augustus Pitt Rivers
 1885–1910: Edwin Freshfield
 1910–1930: Edward Brabrook
 1930–1942: Sir Montagu Sharpe
 1943–1946: Edmund Byng, 6th Earl of Strafford
 1947–1949: Harry Nathan, 1st Baron Nathan
 1950–1958: W. F. Grimes
 1959–1964: D. B. Harden
 1965–1970: R. Michael Robbins
 1971–1973: A. J. Taylor
 1974–1976: Ralph Merrifield
 1977–1979: Max Hebditch
 1980–1981: Valerie Pearl
 1982–1985: John Wilkes
 1985–1988: John Kent
 1988–1991: Derek Renn
 1991–1992: Hugh Chapman
 1992–1993: Derek Renn
 1993–1996: Harvey Sheldon
 1996–1999: Mark Hassall
 1999–2002: Derek Keene
 2002–2005: Clive Orton
 2005–2008: Simon Thurley
 2008–2011: Caroline Barron
 2011–2014: Martin Biddle
 2014–2017: John Clark
 2017–2020: Taryn Nixon
 2020–  : Gillian Tindall

References

Further reading

External links

Archaeological organizations
1855 establishments in England
History of London
Archaeology of London
History organisations based in London
Organizations established in 1855